Nivy Station (Slovak: Stanica Nivy), also known as Nivy Centrum, Bus station Nivy (Slovak: Autobusová stanica Nivy), or simple Nivy, is a multifunctional building consisting of a bus station, a shopping center and a market in Bratislava on Mlynské nivy street in the Bratislava city borough Ružinov, in its neighborhood Nivy. The construction is located on the site of the original Bratislava Central Bus Station, which was demolished at the end of 2017, and the tentative completion date was originally set for 2020. Due to the COVID-19 pandemic, the term has been moved, and so the grand opening takes place four days from 30 September 2021. At 3:00 am on the first day of the station's opening, the first bus left the station. The construction was carried out by the company HB Reavis, which also participates in the construction of a new urban zone called Nové Nivy, in which the complex is located.

Characteristics 
The building has five floors above ground and two underground. On the first underground floor, there will be an area of approximately 30,000 m² of the station itself, on the second parking lot.  The bus station has more than 2,000 parking spaces. About half of them are in the basement. The building houses bus platforms and cash registers, commercial establishments, a market and services on three floors and the green roof of the building with park and sidewalks. On the edge of the complex there is a 125-meter high office tower called Nivy Tower, which is the second tallest in Slovakia. Next to the complex under the reconstructed Mlynské nivy street is the first underground roundabout in Slovakia, which was launched together with the opening of the Nivy Station building.

References

External links 

 Official website
 Architectonic a disposition solution at Siebert + Talaš

Buildings and structures in Bratislava